Carinapex minutissima is a species of sea snail, a marine gastropod mollusk in the family Horaiclavidae.

It was previously included within the subfamily Crassispirinae in the family Turridae.

Description
The length of the shell varies between 2 mm and 3 mm.

(Original description) The minute, solid shell has an elongate ovate shape. The lightbrown spire is rather short. It contains 6 whorls, spirally granulated. The granulesare rather large, closely set, disposed in two rows on the whorls of the spire, the lower one the larger. The base is contracted and spirally ridged. The aperture is ovate, deep-brown, one-third the length of the shell. The posterior sinus is large, circular, margins nearly united. The peristome is rather sharp and strongly arched. The columella is smooth and nearly vertical.

Distribution
This marine species occurs off Hawaii, the Philippines, Taiwan and Réunion

References

External links
  Tucker, J.K. 2004 Catalog of recent and fossil turrids (Mollusca: Gastropoda). Zootaxa 682:1–1295.
 
 Specimen at MNHN, Paris

minutissima